Podocarpus brasiliensis is a species of conifer in the family Podocarpaceae. It is found in Brazil and Venezuela.

References

brasiliensis
Least concern plants
Taxonomy articles created by Polbot
Taxa named by David John de Laubenfels